The 2015 NCAA Division I Men's Golf Championship was the 77th annual tournament to determine the national champions of NCAA Division I collegiate golf. It was contested from May 29 – June 3, 2015 at The Concession Golf Club in Bradenton, Florida. The tournament was hosted by the University of South Florida. Two championships were awarded: team and individual. The LSU Tigers won their fifth national title and first since 1955.

This was also the first time that the men's and women's Division I golf tournaments were played at the same location and time.

Regional qualifying tournaments
The five teams with the lowest team scores qualified from each of the six regional tournaments for both the team and individual national championships.
The lowest scoring individual not affiliated with one of the qualified teams in their regional also qualified for the individual national championship.

^ – Teams listed in qualifying order.

Venue
This was the first NCAA Division I Men's Golf Championship held at The Concession Golf Club in Bradenton, Florida, and the first time the tournament was hosted by the University of South Florida.

Team competition

Leaderboard

Remaining teams: Washington (890), Texas Tech (891), Virginia (893), Oklahoma State (896), UAB (896), Stanford (899), Charlotte (901), Oregon (902), Arizona State (903), Duke (903), Houston (906), UNLV (906), Florida (910), Oklahoma (910), Clemson (915).

After 54 holes, the field of 30 teams was cut to the top 15. SMU beat Washington on the first hole of a sudden-death playoff for the 15th spot.

Match play bracket
The eight teams with the lowest total scores advanced to the match play bracket.

Source:

Individual competition

The field was cut after 54 holes to the top 15 teams and the top nine individuals not on a top 15 team. These 84 players competed for the individual championship.

See also
2015 NCAA Division I Women's Golf Championship

References

NCAA Men's Golf Championship
Golf in Florida
NCAA Division I Men's Golf Championship
NCAA Division I Men's Golf Championship
NCAA Division I Men's Golf Championship
NCAA Division I Men's Golf Championship